Devsar Dhaam is a location in the Bhiwani District of Haryana, India. It stands on a hillock on Bhiwani-Luharu Road, and has a temple devoted to the goddess Vaishno Devi. Devsar is a place of great religious importance. The goddess Maa Durga attracts hundreds of thousands of pilgrims from all over Northern India. Also, an important fair is held at Devsar twice a year, in the month of Chaitra and Ashvina on sudi ashtmi. During, that period a large number of devotees visit this temple and pay their respects to the goddess. Especially newly married couples and newborns come here to pay their respects to Maa Durga. Bhavani.

External links
Devsar Dham Website-Unofficial

Bhiwani